Straight and narrow or strait and narrow may refer to:

strait is the gate, and narrow is the way, which leadeth unto life, a phrase from Matthew 7:14
"Straight and Narrow" (The Outer Limits), a television episode
The Straight and Narrow, a 1918 film starring Oliver Hardy
"Walk the Straight and Narrow" (Batman), a television episode
The strait and narrow path described in the tree of life vision in the Book of Mormon